Vincent Antonio Rottino (born April 7, 1980) is an American former professional baseball utility player. He has played positions including catcher, first base, third base, and the outfield.

He graduated from St. Catherine's High School in Racine, and then went to the University of Wisconsin–La Crosse.

Career

Milwaukee Brewers
Rottino originally signed with the Milwaukee Brewers as an undrafted free agent on February 3, 2003. He played in nine games and batted .214.

Rottino began the  season in Triple-A with the Nashville Sounds. He spent nearly the entire season there before being recalled by Milwaukee on September 1. On September 29, Rottino hit a walk-off single in the bottom of the 11th inning to beat the San Diego Padres 4–3 and clinch the first winning season for the Brewers since .

He repeated most of his previous season's fashion in 2008, playing most of the season at Triple-A, then receiving a call-up in September.

Rottino was the starting catcher for  Team Italy in the 2009 World Baseball Classic.

In 2009, Rottino accepted an assignment to Double-A Huntsville.

Los Angeles Dodgers
On July 31, 2009, he was traded by the Brewers to the Los Angeles Dodgers for Claudio Vargas.

Florida Marlins
He signed a minor league contract with the Florida Marlins in 2010 and made his first appearance in the Majors since 2008.

New York Mets

On November 16, 2011, Rottino signed a minor league contract with the New York Mets. On May 4, 2012, Rottino got called up to the Mets after Chris Schwinden was sent down.

On May 26, 2012, Rottino hit his first career home run against the Padres' Clayton Richard. He hit another home run on May 28, 2012, against the Philadelphia Phillies.

On June 25, 2012, Rottino was designated for assignment to make room on the Mets' roster for Justin Hampson.

Cleveland Indians
On June 27, 2012, the Cleveland Indians claimed him off outright waivers. The Indians designated Chris Schwinden to make room on the 40-man roster. On August 1, Rottino was recalled by the Indians when Travis Hafner was placed on paternity leave. He was hitting .299 with four HRs and 32 RBIs with the Triple-A Columbus Clippers. Rottino was outrighted to the minor leagues on Oct. 31, 2012, and subsequently elected free agency.

Orix Buffaloes
On November 30, 2012, he signed a one-year $350,000 contract with the Orix Buffaloes of Nippon Professional Baseball.

Nexen Heroes
On December 11, 2013, he signed a one-year $300,000 contract with the Nexen Heroes of the KBO League.

Miami Marlins
On December 24, 2014, Rottino signed a minor league contract with the Miami Marlins.

Chicago White Sox
On February 3, 2016, Rottino signed a minor league deal with the Chicago White Sox. On September 9, it was announced that Rottino had decided to retire from professional baseball.

References

External links

Career statistics and player information from KBO League

1980 births
Living people
American people of Italian descent
American expatriate baseball players in Japan
American expatriate baseball players in South Korea
Azucareros del Este players
Beloit Snappers players
Baseball players from Wisconsin
Buffalo Bisons (minor league) players
Chattanooga Lookouts players
Cleveland Indians players
Columbus Clippers players
Florida Marlins players
Helena Brewers players
Huntsville Stars players
Jacksonville Suns players
KBO League outfielders
Major League Baseball third basemen
Milwaukee Brewers players
Nashville Sounds players
New Orleans Zephyrs players
New York Mets players
Kiwoom Heroes players
Nippon Professional Baseball infielders
Nippon Professional Baseball outfielders
Orix Buffaloes players
Peoria Javelinas players
Scottsdale Scorpions players
Sportspeople from Racine, Wisconsin
Sportspeople from the Milwaukee metropolitan area
Tigres de Aragua players
American expatriate baseball players in Venezuela
Toros del Este players
American expatriate baseball players in the Dominican Republic
Wisconsin–La Crosse Eagles baseball players
2009 World Baseball Classic players